Geophilic means soil loving or preferring the soil. This term is usually used when referring to certain types of fungi or molds that live in the soil. Many of these organisms are usually recovered from the soil but occasionally infect humans and animals. They cause a marked inflammatory reaction, which limits the spread of the infection and may lead to a spontaneous cure but may also leave scars.

Can also refer to someone who loves the earth, sustainability, or “green” initiatives. An individual with these tendencies may be referred to as a "geophile."

References

Microbial growth and nutrition